Warford is a former settlement in Summers County, West Virginia, United States. Warford was located on the New River, east of Pipestem and appeared on maps as late as 1933.

The community was named for a nearby ford possibly used by Indian warriors to cross the river.

References

Geography of Summers County, West Virginia
Ghost towns in West Virginia